Kisbér is a town in northern Hungary, in Komárom-Esztergom county. It is the administrative centre of Kisbér District.  The town was first mentioned in 1277.

Royal Stud
Kisber was home to the  Imperial-Royal Stud where a Thoroughbred racehorse named for the town was bred under the supervision of Stud's manager, Count Zoest. Foaled in 1873, Kisber raced in England where in 1876 he won that country's most prestigious race, The Derby. He was then sent to Paris where he won France's most important race, the Grand Prix de Paris.

Twin towns — sister cities

Kisbér is twinned with:
 Câmpia Turzii, Romania
 Eslohe, Germany
 Kolárovo, Slovakia  
 Vodňany, Czech Republic

People 
 Lipót Baumhorn, architect

References

External links

  in Hungarian and English

Populated places in Komárom-Esztergom County